Ernest William Nicholls (31 March 1884 – 13 August 1954) was an Australian rules footballer who played with St Kilda in the Victorian Football League (VFL).

References

External links 

1884 births
1954 deaths
Australian rules footballers from Victoria (Australia)
St Kilda Football Club players